Ren Yueli (born April 13, 1988), better known by her nickname Xidan Girl, is a Chinese Mandopop recording artist and a previous street musician-turned Internet celebrity.

Biography
From a poor village in Zhuozhou, Hebei, she migrated to Beijing at the age of 16 looking for work. Struggling to get by, she was eventually forced to perform songs on a street. In December 2008, a video of her performing the song "Tianshi de Chibang" (天使的翅膀; "Angel's Wings") with a guitar in Xidan subway station, Beijing, recorded by a bystander, went viral online. As her name was unknown then, she was simply called "Xidan Girl" by Chinese netizens, many claiming to have been reduced to tears by her heartfelt performance.

TV stations and journalists soon located her and she began performing on TV. In April 2010, Ren Yueli signed with Beijing New Run Entertainment Co., Ltd. In 2011, she performed in CCTV New Year's Gala, China's top-watched annual television event.

Her life experiences were dramatized in a 2011 Chinese film Xidan Girl.

Discography
2012 album: Xidan Girl

Publications

Filmography
 2013 — Yang Guang Liu Shou

References

External links
A version of the original viral video, where she sang "Tianshi de Chibang" (天使的翅膀; "Angel's Wings") in a Xidan subway tunnel
Music Video of her 2014 single "Yuan Dian" (原点), end theme song of the anime Hua Jiang Hu zhi Bu Liang Ren (画江湖之不良人)

Chinese Mandopop singers
1988 births
Musicians from Baoding
Living people
Chinese Internet celebrities
Singers from Hebei
21st-century Chinese women singers